L-165041 is a phenyloxyacetate PPARδ receptor agonist. It is less potent and PPARδ selective than GW 501516.

See also 
 GW 501516
 GFT505
 MBX-8025
 GW0742
 Peroxisome proliferator-activated receptor

References 

PPAR agonists